Sharavyn Gungaadorj (born 2 May 1935) is a Mongolian politician and was the 14th Prime Minister of Mongolia (Chairman of the Council of Ministers) from March 21 to September 11, 1990.

Life 
Gungaadorj was born 1935 in the Ikhkhet sum in Dornogovi Province. He graduated from the Russian State Agricultural University in Moscow in 1959.  After holding several positions within the PMRP Central Committee from 1967-1968 he went on to become deputy minister of agriculture.  In 1980 he was appointed first deputy minister of state farms and in 1981 he became first secretary of the Selenge Province MPRP Committee.  In 1986 he was appointed minister of agriculture.

Before becoming Prime Minister, Gungaadorj was a member of the State Great Khural (parliament) for the constituency 33 in the Selenge Province and an advisor to the President of Mongolia. From 1987 to 21 March 1990 he served concurrently as deputy chairman of the Council of Ministers and minister of agriculture and food industry.  After the resignation en masse of the Politburo and government, including Prime Minister Dumaagiin Sodnom, on 21 March 1990 in the wake of anti-government demonstrations Sodnom became chairman of the Council of Ministers, or Prime Minister in what was essentially an interim administration before the first free elections could be staged the following September.

In 1992 he was appointed ambassador from Mongolia to the Democratic People's Republic of Korea and later to Kazakhstan. He again became a member of parliament from 2000 to 2004, also serving as the Chairman of the Standing Committee on Environment and Rural Development.  He did not stand for parliamentary elections in 2004 and in 2009 acted as an advisor to the Minister of Environment and Tourism.

Gungaadorj holds a PhD in agricultural sciences, and is a member of the Mongolian Academy of Sciences. He is married and has three children.

Since 1997, Gungaadorj is the managing director of the "Agropro" corporation.

References

Sources 
 Gungaadorj, Sharawyn - Who is who in Mongolian politics (German)
Sanders, Alan J. K., Historical Dictionary of Mongolia, 1996, .

1935 births
Living people
Ambassadors of Mongolia to North Korea
Members of the State Great Khural
Mongolian communists
Mongolian expatriates in the Soviet Union
Mongolian People's Party politicians
Prime Ministers of Mongolia
People from Dornogovi Province